Elixabete "Eli" Sarasola Nieto (born 12 April 1991) is a Spanish former footballer who last played as a goalkeeper for PSV of the Eredivisie Vrouwen.

Trained at university level in the United States, Sarasola played college soccer for three seasons for Charleston Cougars and later featured for USL W-League team Colorado Rush Women in 2013. Before moving to America she represented FC Barcelona in Spain's Primera División.

References

External links

 
 Profile at College of Charleston Cougars
 Profile at aupaAthletic.com 

1991 births
Living people
Spanish women's footballers
Footballers from San Sebastián
Primera División (women) players
FC Barcelona Femení players
Eredivisie (women) players
AFC Ajax (women) players
PSV (women) players
Expatriate women's footballers in the Netherlands
Spanish expatriate sportspeople in the Netherlands
Expatriate women's soccer players in the United States
Spanish expatriate sportspeople in the United States
USL W-League (1995–2015) players
College of Charleston Cougars women's soccer players
Real Sociedad (women) players
Añorga KKE players
Women's association football goalkeepers